Tenderfoot or The Tenderfoot may refer to:
 Tenderfoot Scout, the second rank in Scouts BSA
 A guest at a guest ranch, also known as a "dude"
 "Tenderfoot", a song by Tom Morgan on the Lemonheads album Car Button Cloth
 The Tenderfoot (1917 film), a 1917 American film starring and directed by William Duncan
 The Tenderfoot (1919 film), a 1919 American comedy film starring and directed by Marcel Perez
 The Tenderfoot (film), a 1932 film starring Joe E. Brown
 Alternate title of The Dude Goes West, a 1948 comedy Western film featuring Eddie Albert
 The Tenderfoot (miniseries), a 1964 Disney television miniseries
 The Tenderfoot (band), a British band
 Alternate title of Bushwhacked (film), a 1995 film starring Daniel Stern
 Tenderfoot Mountain, a mountain in Colorado

See also
 Le Pied-tendre (translation: The Tenderfoot), a 1968 French comic